Habronattus agilis is a species of jumping spider in the family Salticidae. It is found in the United States.

References

External links

 

Salticidae
Articles created by Qbugbot
Spiders described in 1893
Taxa named by Nathan Banks